Presidential elections were held in Colombia on 5 May 1946, pitching the Colombian Conservative Party against two different Colombian Liberal Party candidates. The Liberals received more votes combined, but due to their division the result was a victory for Mariano Ospina Pérez of the Conservative Party, who received 41.4% of the vote. One of the Liberal candidates, Gabriel Turbay, was also supported by the Social Democratic Party.

Two years after the election, the second Liberal Party candidate, Jorge Eliécer Gaitán Ayala, was assassinated. This in turn sparked a ten-year civil war known as La Violencia.

Results

References

Presidential elections in Colombia
1946 in Colombia
Colombia
May 1946 events in South America